Stigmatophora flava is a moth in the subfamily Arctiinae. It was described by Otto Vasilievich Bremer and William Grey in 1852. It is found in Kazakhstan, Russia (southern Siberia, Amur, Primorye), China, Korea and Japan.

References

Arctiidae genus list at Butterflies and Moths of the World of the Natural History Museum

Moths described in 1852
Lithosiini
Moths of Asia